The 1991–92 UEFA Cup was the 21st season of Europe's then-tertiary club football tournament organised by UEFA. It was won by Dutch club Ajax on away goals over Torino of Italy. The victory made Ajax only the second team – after Torino's city rivals Juventus – to have won all three major European trophies (European Cup/UEFA Champions League, UEFA Cup/UEFA Europa League, and the Cup Winners' Cup).

Although this was the second season since the ban on English clubs in European competitions was lifted, only one English club was entered into the 1991–92 UEFA Cup. Liverpool, who had been forced to serve an extra year over all other English clubs as they had been the team present at the Heysel disaster which had sparked the ban in 1985, was England's representatives in the competition, and ultimately reached the quarter-finals. The defending champion was Internazionale, which was eliminated in the first round by Boavista.

Teams
A total of 64 teams participated in the competition, all entering into the first round.

Notes

First round

|}
1 This match was played in Düsseldorf, Germany due to hooliganism in a previous match.
2 This match was played in Klagenfurt, Austria due to the outbreak of the Croatian War of Independence.
3 This match was played in Istanbul, Turkey due to the deteriorating security situation in Yugoslavia that eventually turned into the Yugoslav Wars.

First leg

Match was played in Austria due to the outbreak of the Croatian War of Independence.

Because of hooliganism in a previous match, Ajax was ordered to play this match at least 200 km away from Amsterdam.

Match played at Estádio do Bessa instead of their regular stadium Estádio Engenheiro Vidal Pinheiro.

Second leg

Steaua București won 4–3 on aggregate.

Celtic won 3–1 on aggregate.

Bayern Munich won 3–1 on aggregate.

Eintracht Frankfurt won 11–1 on aggregate.

Torpedo Moscow won 4–2 on aggregate.

Neuchâtel Xamax won 2–0 on aggregate.

Real Madrid won 3–2 on aggregate.

B 1903 won 3–0 on aggregate.

Ajax won 4–0 on aggregate.

Sigma Olomouc won 6–0 on aggregate.

Boavista won 2–1 on aggregate.

Trabzonspor won 4–3 on aggregate.

Rot-Weiß Erfurt won 2–0 on aggregate.

Auxerre won 6–1 on aggregate.

Swarovski Tirol won 3–2 on aggregate.

Hamburg won 4–1 on aggregate.

1–1 on aggregate. Gent won 4–1 on penalties.

Torino won 8–1 on aggregate.

Liverpool won 6–2 on aggregate.

PAOK won 2–1 on aggregate.

1–1 on aggregate. CSKA Sofia won on away goals.

Osasuna won 4–1 on aggregate.

Utrecht won 4-1 on aggregate.

Dinamo București won 2–1 on aggregate.

Dynamo Moscow won 4–2 on aggregate.

Stuttgart won 6–3 on aggregate.

AEK won 3–0 on aggregate.

Spartak Moscow won 5–1 on aggregate.

Lyon won 2–1 on aggregate.

Genoa won 3–2 on aggregate.

1–1 on aggregate. Cannes won 4–2 on penalties.

2–2 on aggregate. Sporting Gijón won 3–2 on penalties.
Match was played in Turkey due to the deteriorating security situation in Yugoslavia that eventually turned into the Yugoslav Wars.

Second round

|}

First leg

Second leg

B 1903 won 6–3 on aggregate.

Osasuna won 3–2 on aggregate.

Liverpool won 3–2 on aggregate.

Dynamo Moscow won 2–1 on aggregate.

Real Madrid won 4–1 on aggregate.

Because of hooliganism in a previous match, Ajax was ordered to play this match at least 200 km away from Amsterdam.
Ajax won 5–1 on aggregate.

AEK won 2–1 on aggregate.

Genoa won 5–3 on aggregate.

Hamburg won 6–1 on aggregate.

Gent won 1–0 on aggregate.

Neuchâtel Xamax won 5–2 on aggregate.

Trabzonspor won 8–4 on aggregate.

Swarovski Tirol won 4–0 on aggregate.

Torino won 2–0 on aggregate.

Sigma Olomouc won 2–0 on aggregate.

Steaua București won 3–2 on aggregate.

Third round

|}

First leg

Second leg

Sigma Olomouc won 6–2 on aggregate.

Torino won 3–2 on aggregate.

B 1903 won 2–1 on aggregate.

Because of hooliganism in a previous match, Ajax was ordered to play this match at least 200 km away from Amsterdam. Ajax won 2–0 on aggregate.

Liverpool won 6–0 on aggregate.

Gent won 2–0 on aggregate.

Genoa won 2–0 on aggregate.

Real Madrid won 4–1 on aggregate.

Quarter-finals

|}

First leg

Second leg

Genoa won 4–1 on aggregate.

Ajax won 3–0 on aggregate.

Real Madrid won 2–1 on aggregate.

Torino won 3–0 on aggregate.

Semi-finals

|}

First leg

Second leg

Ajax won 4–3 on aggregate.

Torino won 3–2 on aggregate.

Final

First leg

Second leg

2–2 on aggregate. Ajax won on away goals.

Top scorers
The top scorers from the 1991–92 UEFA Cup are as follows:

References

External links
1991–92 All matches UEFA Cup – season at UEFA website
Official site
Results at RSSSF.com
 All scorers 1991–92 UEFA Cup according to protocols UEFA
1991/92 UEFA Cup - results and line-ups (archive)

 
UEFA Cup seasons
2